Köprülü (formerly Korehenk) is a town (belde) and municipality in the Göle District, Ardahan Province, Turkey. Its population is 2,102 (2021).

Geography 
The town consists of 3 quarters: Dedeşen, 
Durançam and Kuzupınarı.

History 
Köprülü, founded in the late 18th century, was ceded to the Russian Empire in 1878 by the Treaty of Berlin (1878). But on December 2, 1921, Köprülü was returned to Turkey by the Treaty of Alexandropol (Gümrü). The name of the settlement was then Korehenk. In 1962, the name was changed to Köprülü (“place with bridge”), referring to the wooden bridge in the settlement. In 1971, Köprülü was declared a seat of township.

Economy 

Köprülü is a high altitude town. Because of the cold winters, agriculture is quite limited, and the major economic activity of the town is cattle breeding.

References

Populated places in Ardahan Province
Towns in Turkey
Göle District